The list of ship decommissionings in 1869 includes a chronological list of all ships decommissioned in 1869.


References

See also 

1869
 Ship decommissionings